Modiolus can refer to: 
 Modiolus (cochlea)
 Modiolus (face)
 Modiolus (bivalve), a genus of mussels in the Mytilidae